Longgan Lake（）is a freshwater lake in central China, divided between Susong County of Anhui Province and Huangmei County at the eastern extremity of Hubei Province. The lake is situated near the north bank of the middle reaches of Yangtze River, opposite Poyang Lake (which is south of the Yangtze). The lake was named Longgan Lake in a 1955 decision which combined the names of two former lakes, Long Lake and Gan Lake.

It is an important marsh protective area. Longgan Lake is an important aquatic farming area.

Geography

Administrative Divisions
The western shore of Longgan Lake is in Huanggang; the area is administered under the Longganhu Administrative District (total area: 100 km2). Longganhu Administrative District administers:

Notes

Lakes of Hubei
Lakes of Anhui
Huangmei County